Préville (17 or 19 September 1721 – 18 December 1799) was a French comic actor.

Biography
Born Pierre-Louis Dubus to an impoverished family in Paris, he was originally intended for the clergy. While playing with a mediocre troop of actors in provincial France, Préville's budding talents were spotted in the town of Rouen by Jean Monnet, who engaged him to perform with the Opéra-Comique in Paris in 1743. Later Préville returned to the provinces and was the manager of the Grand Théâtre in Lyon.

He joined the Comédie Francaise in Paris in 1753, where he debuted on 20 September in the role of Crispin in Jean-François Regnard's Le Légataire universel (The Sole Legatee). One of his most notable successes was playing 6 characters in one in Edmé Boursault's Le Mercure galant.

He retired in 1786, returning to the stage in 1791 and 1794–5, and died in Beauvais at the age of 78 years and 3 months.  He was married to Mademoiselle Préville.

See also 
 Troupe of the Comédie-Française in 1754
 Troupe of the Comédie-Française in 1755

References
Notes

Sources
 Forman, Edward (2010). Historical Dictionary of French Theatre. Lanham, Maryland: The Scarecrow Press. .
 Hartnoll, Phyllis (1983). The Oxford Companion to the Theatre. Oxford: Oxford University Press. .
 L'Intermédiaire des chercheurs et curieux, vol. 36 (1897). Paris. View at Google Books.
 Michaud, Louis Gabriel (1863). Biographie universelle ancienne et moderne, vol. 34. Paris: Desplaces. View at Google Books.

1721 births
1799 deaths
Male actors from Paris
French male stage actors
18th-century French male actors
Sociétaires of the Comédie-Française